Palace Hotel is a heritage-listed pub at 227 Argent Street, Broken Hill, City of Broken Hill, New South Wales, Australia. It has also been known as the Broken Hill Coffee Palace, Mario's Hotel and Marios. It was added to the New South Wales State Heritage Register on 2 April 1999.

History 

The hotel was originally built as a Temperance movement coffee palace, the Broken Hill Coffee Palace. It was designed by Melbourne architect Alfred Dunn and built in 1889 at a cost of £12,190, opening on 18 December that year. The coffee palace was not a financial success, running at a loss for its first three years, and by July 1892 media reports indicated the company and lessees were "stone broke". In that month, the lessee applied for and was granted a liquor license, at which time it was renamed the Palace Hotel.

Owner Mario Celotto painted a mural of Botticelli's Venus on a ceiling. This led to many more murals being painted both by Celotto and other artists, making the hotel a tourist attraction.

The 1994 Australian comedy-drama film, The Adventures of Priscilla, Queen of the Desert, filmed many of its Broken Hill scenes in the Palace Hotel, which producer Al Clark described as "drag queen heaven". The movie describes the hotel's murals as "tack-o-rama".

Description

Heritage listing 
Palace Hotel was listed on the New South Wales State Heritage Register on 2 April 1999.

See also

References

Notes

Bibliography

Attribution

External links

New South Wales State Heritage Register
Buildings and structures in Broken Hill, New South Wales
Pubs in New South Wales
Articles incorporating text from the New South Wales State Heritage Register